Carlos Latre, (Castellón de la Plana, 30 January 1979) is a Spanish comedy actor.

He studied until the last year of high-school in the Institut Martí Franqués from Tarragona.

He started in several radio stations as a presenter: Ser, 40 Principales or Cadena Dial.

His first TV programme was the 1999 TV3 show Xou com sou, and he became very popular thanks to his impersonations of La Pitonisa Lola, Dinio, Pepe Navarro, Boris Izaguirre, the Duchess of Alba, Rosa López, Tamara Falcó, Jorge Berrocal, Joaquín Sabina, Jesús Quintero, Carmen Vijande, Toni Genil, Leonardo Dantés, José Manuel Parada and la Pantoja de Puerto Rico.

Telecinco gave him a program, Latrelevisión and he later moved to Cuatro.

TV 
1999 TV3,  Xou com sou 
Telecinco, Crónicas marcianas
2003 Telecinco, Latrelevisión
2005-2006 Cuatro, Maracaná
2008-     TV3 Crackovia

Filmography 
Torrente 3: el protector (2005)
El oro de Moscú (2003)

External links 

Official page

1979 births
Living people
People from Castellón de la Plana
Actors from the Valencian Community
Spanish male film actors
Spanish comedians
Spanish impressionists (entertainers)
Spanish male voice actors
Spanish male television actors